Charles Keating (22 October 1941 – 8 August 2014) was an English actor.

Background
Keating was born in London to Roman Catholic parents who had emigrated from Ireland, Charles James Keating and Margaret (née Shevlin) Keating,

Keating moved to the United States via Canada with his family as a teenager. He was working as a hairdresser in Buffalo, New York, when a customer suggested he try out for a local play, making his stage debut in 1959 with the Buffalo Studio Theatre.

Keating found steady work with the Cleveland Play House repertory company and was on tour when he met his future wife, actress Mary Chobody. The two were married in 1964 while Keating was serving in the United States Army and directing plays for its entertainment division at Fort Sill in Oklahoma. Keating later acted at the Charles Playhouse in Boston before eventually joining the Guthrie Theatre in Minneapolis. In 1971, he was asked by Tyrone Guthrie to move back to England and open the Crucible Theatre in Sheffield.

UK career
He appeared with the Royal Shakespeare Company at Stratford-upon-Avon before turning to television (he was in the pilot episode of the long-running ITV series Crown Court in 1972), winning the roles of Ernest Simpson in Edward & Mrs. Simpson and Rex Mottram in ITV's Brideshead Revisited. In 1978 on the BBC Shakespeare series, he played the role of Rutland, Duke of Aumerle, in Richard II.

US career

Television/soap operas
He is best known for his role as Carl Hutchins in the American soap opera Another World from 1983 to 1985, and again from 1991 to 1998 with a final appearance in 1999. He played also Charles in the satirical miniseries Fresno in 1986, which parodied the prime-time soaps of the day such as Dynasty and Dallas.

After Another World ended its run, he returned to stage acting and to Shakespeare in a two-person show with former Another World co-star Victoria Wyndham.

During 2001 and 2002, Charles played the part of James Richfield on Port Charles.

In between stints on Another World, he played Dr. Damon Lazarre on All My Children, and Niles Mason on As the World Turns. He also had a role as a professor at a Caribbean medical school that catered to Americans in the short-lived ABC sitcom Going to Extremes as well as a guest role on Sex and the City.

Feature films
In 1992, he appeared in The Bodyguard. In 2005, he had a supporting role in Deuce Bigalow: European Gigolo.

Theatre
Broadway roles include Loot by Joe Orton (1986), for which he was nominated for a Tony Award for Best Featured Actor in a Play, The Resistible Rise of Arturo Ui (1968) and The House of Atreus (1968), which comprised three classics: Agamemnon, Choephori, and Eumenides.

In 2001, he played the role of Carney/Oscar Wilde in the Lincoln Center performance of A Man of No Importance. In 2007, he played the role of Clement O'Donnell in the Guthrie Theater production of Brian Friel's The Home Place.

Awards
At the 23rd Daytime Emmy Awards, Keating won the 1995 Daytime Emmy Award for Outstanding Lead Actor in a Drama Series for his performance in the role of Carl Hutchins on Another World.

Death
Keating died of lung cancer at the age of 72 on 8 August 2014 in Weston, Connecticut. He was survived by his wife, Mary, and the couple's two sons.

Filmography

Television

References

External links
 
 TV Interview with Charles Keating about his role in the Guthrie Theater's July–August 2000 production of The Twelfth Night (28:40).

1941 births
2014 deaths
Deaths from lung cancer
Deaths from cancer in Connecticut
20th-century English male actors
21st-century English male actors
English male stage actors
English male soap opera actors
Daytime Emmy Award winners
Daytime Emmy Award for Outstanding Lead Actor in a Drama Series winners
Male actors from London
English expatriates in the United States
English people of Irish descent